is a Japanese manga series written and illustrated by Ryō Minenami. It has been serialized in Shueisha's Weekly Young Jump magazine since February 2020, and has been compiled into twelve volumes as of March 2023. A live-action television drama adaptation aired from September to October 2022.

Plot
Reiji Kurose lives with his brother, his mother, who works as a nurse, and his grandmother in a rural town. He is childhood friends with Sakuko Akiyama. One day, Reiji meets Nagi Aoe, a member of the idol group Acrylic who is working as a convenience store clerk. Nagi tells Reiji of a place in the town known as the "Lover's Abyss", which is claimed to be a place where lovers commit suicide. Reiji and Nagi attempt suicide but fail, and Reiji is rescued by his teacher Yuri Shibasawa, who then vows to protect him.

Characters

The main character, who plans on leaving the town but is conflicted by the circumstances he is facing. He considers going to university in Tokyo.

A member of the idol group Acrylic, who had gone on hiatus and moved to Reiji's town, where she works as a convenience store clerk. She is married to Kosaku Esemori. Following her suicide attempt, she quits her job and returns to Tokyo to resume her idol activities.

Reiji's childhood friend who studies at a private all-girls' school and is aiming to go to university in Tokyo. She wants to be an author, in particular admiring Esemori's work, and is a fan of the idol group Acrylic. She is nicknamed  due to her chubby looks. She offers to be Esemori's editor but later ends the agreement after he attempted to sexually harass her.

Reiji's teacher who appears to have developed feelings for him and wishes to protect him, to the point of letting him stay at her house. She was a table tennis champion during her high school years.

Reiji and Sakuko's childhood friend, whose family owns and operates a construction company.

Reiji's mother, who works as a nurse at the local hospital. She separated from Reiji's father prior to the events of the series, and is secretly having sex with Gen's father. She went to the same high school as Esemori and is implied to have had a romantic relationship with him.

A popular author and Nagi's husband, who moved back to his hometown to take care of his mother. He is implied to have had a romantic relationship with Yuko, who went to the same school as him.

Media

Manga
Written and illustrated by Ryō Minenami, Boy's Abyss began serialization in Shueisha's Weekly Young Jump magazine in February 27, 2020; it has been compiled into eleven tankōbon volumes as of March 17, 2023.

In June 2022, Viz Media announced that they licensed the series for English publication.

Volume list

Live-action
A live-action television drama adaptation was announced on July 27, 2022. It was directed by Misato Kato with scripts by Kyoko Inukai and Towa Araki performing the lead role. The series aired on MBS TV's  programming block from September 2 to October 21, 2022. RIM performed the opening theme , while SpendyMily performed the ending theme "Iris".

Reception
In 2021, the series was placed 11th in the 7th Next Manga Award in the print category. As of July 2022, the series has over one million copies in circulation.

See also
Hatsukoi Zombie, another manga series by the same author

Notes

References

External links
Official manga website 
Official television drama website 

2020 manga
Drama anime and manga
Manga adapted into television series
Manga series
Psychological anime and manga
Seinen manga
Shueisha manga
Thriller anime and manga
Viz Media manga